Tobar an Dualchais – Kist o Riches is a project which aims to preserve and digitize material gathered in Scottish Gaelic, Scots and English by the School of Scottish Studies (of the University of Edinburgh), BBC Scotland and the Canna Collection of the National Trust for Scotland.

Much of the material consists of recordings of folklore, songs and music, local history and other data gathered from the 1930s onwards.

References

External links
 Official site

Scottish culture
Scottish folklore
Scots language
Scottish Gaelic language
Scottish Gaelic literature
Scottish Gaelic music
Scots-language literature